Chris Barrett (born July 24, 1982 in Bryn Mawr, Pennsylvania) is an American Internet entrepreneur, film director, spokesperson, and author who is featured in the 2004 Sundance award winning documentary The Corporation and its 2020 sequel The New Corporation: The Unfortunately Necessary Sequel.

Early life and background 
Barrett grew up in Bryn Mawr, PA and graduated from Haddonfield Memorial High School in 2001. Barrett attended Pepperdine University.

Career

First Corporately Sponsored College Student 
Barrett launched his entrepreneurial career in high school, during a national search for a corporation to sponsor his college education. In exchange for college tuition, Barrett was willing to be a company's “spokesguy” and wear clothes with the sponsors' logo on them. The inspiration for the came after Chris saw a TV commercial featuring professional golfer and Nike spokesperson Tiger Woods wearing Nike logo on his hat.

Barrett was named an up-and-comer to watch in 2001 by the New York Post, during his search to become the first corporately sponsored college student.

Barrett became the first corporately sponsored college student, when he was named a financial responsibility spokesperson for the credit card company First USA, which was owned by BankOne. The corporate sponsorship announcement happened on NBC’s The Today Show in June 2001.

Powerhouse Pictures 
In 2006, Barrett co-founded Powerhouse Pictures with actor Efren Ramirez. Where he directed the documentary After School, about teacher student sex scandals, which was announced on CNN’s Larry King Live.

Political career

Grassroots For Sanders 
In 2015, Barrett co-founded #BernItForward, a web app where you would donate $3 on behalf of 3 friends to the 2016 Bernie Sanders Presidential campaign. He then joined Grassroots for Sanders as an assistant fundraising manager, the organization behind the subreddit r/SandersForPresident, where he helped raise $10 million dollars directly to the 2016 Sanders campaign.

Elected to Office 
Inspired by Bernie Sanders progressive politics, in 2017 Barrett joined the Collingswood, New Jersey democratic ticket and was elected to the Camden County Democratic Committee. While elected to office, Barrett worked with the Democratic party to make the voice of younger, more progressive, voters heard within the New Jersey Democratic party. Barrett is an advocate for legalizing marijuana and social justice reform, eliminating student loan debt, and gun control.

The Corporation 
Barrett was featured in Sundance Film Festival award winning documentary film The Corporation is a 2003 Canadian documentary film written by University of British Columbia law professor Joel Bakan, and directed by Mark Achbar and Jennifer Abbott. The documentary examines the modern-day corporation. Barrett was interviewed to discuss being the first corporately sponsored college student.

Barrett was also featured in the 2020 sequel, The New Corporation: The Unfortunately Necessary Sequel, a Canadian documentary film, directed by Joel Bakan and Jennifer Abbott that premiered at the 2020 Toronto International Film Festival. The film profiles new developments in the political and social power of corporations since the release of the original. After 17 years, Chris Barrett returned in the sequel to share his transformation from being the first corporately sponsored college student to pay for his college education to now being a Bernie Sanders inspired progressive grassroots politician. The film also showcases Barrett's run for political office in New Jersey and becoming an elected official.

Direct Your Own Life 
Barrett is co-author of the non-fiction business book Direct Your Own Life: How to be a Star in Any Field Your Choose, published by Kaplan Publishing.

Barrett and Napoleon Dynamite actor Efren Ramirez co-authored the book aimed at encouraging readers to achieve their life goals.

References

External links 

Direct Your Own Life
Chris Barrett on Twitter

American film producers
American film directors
Living people
1982 births